Harry Albert McMackin (February 10, 1880 – October 13, 1946) was a Canadian politician. He served in the Legislative Assembly of New Brunswick as member of the Progressive Conservative party from 1939 to 1944.

References

1880 births
1946 deaths
20th-century Canadian politicians
Progressive Conservative Party of New Brunswick MLAs
People from Kings County, New Brunswick